Paperback Hero is a 1973 Canadian film, directed by Peter Pearson, which starred Keir Dullea and Elizabeth Ashley. It is set in Saskatchewan and portrays the life of a big-fish minor-league hockey player in a little-pond town.  The movie was filmed in Delisle, Saskatchewan.

It was originally titled Last of the Big Guns, but was renamed to reflect the lyrics of Gordon Lightfoot's "If You Could Read My Mind", which was featured on the soundtrack.

It won the Canadian Film Awards in 1973 for Film Editing, Overall Sound, and Cinematography.

It was later screened at the 1984 Festival of Festivals as part of Front & Centre, a special retrospective program of artistically and culturally significant films from throughout the history of Canadian cinema. It was selected in 2006 for TIFF's Canadian Open Vault program, which preserves examples of notable Canadian cinema.

References

External links

1973 films
English-language Canadian films
Canadian ice hockey films
Films shot in Saskatchewan
Films set in Saskatchewan
1970s English-language films
1970s Canadian films